Roy Lee Stewart (August 28, 1901 – April 5, 1980) was an American football coach and college athletics administrator. He served as the head football coach at Union University in Jackson, Tennessee from 1927 to 1930 and Murray State Teachers College—now known as Murray State University—in Murray, Kentucky from 1932 to 1940 and again from 1942 to 1945. Stewart was also the athletic director at Murray State from 1940 to 1966 He came to Murray State in 1931 as an assistant coach. Stewart died on April 5, 1980, at Murray-Calloway County Hospital, in Murray, ten days after undergoing surgery.

Head coaching record

References

External links
 

1901 births
1980 deaths
Murray State Racers athletic directors
Murray State Racers football coaches
Union Bulldogs football coaches